Shivaji Sawant (31 August 1940 – 18 September 2002) was an Indian novelist in the Marathi language. He is known as Mrutyunjaykaar (meaning Author of Mrutyunjay) for writing the famous Marathi novel - Mrutyunjay. He was the first Marathi writer to be awarded with the Moortidevi Award in 1994.

He wrote a book Mrutyunjay (English: Victory Over Death) based on Karna, one of the leading characters of the epic Mahabharat. This book was translated into Hindi (1974), English (1989), Kannada (1990), Gujarati (1991), Malayalam (1995) and received numerous awards and accolades. His novel Chhava, published in 1980, is based on the life of Chhatrapati Sambhaji.

He held the post of the vice-president of Maharashtra Sahitya Parishad since 1995. He was president of Baroda Sahitya Sammelan of 1983. He was not only a historical writer but also a political writer.

Early life
He was born in a small farmer family of Ajara village in Kolhapur district in Maharashtra. He finished his school education in 'Vyankatrao High School Ajara'.  He worked with Rajaram Prashala, Kolhapur as a teacher for 20 years and afterwards as editor with Maharashtra education department's monthly magazine Lokshikshan for six years in Pune (1974–1980).

Work

Books
 Mrityunjay (Novel)
 Chhava (Novel)
 Yugandhar (Novel)
 Kavadase
 Kanchan Kan
 Ladhat
 Ashi Mane Ase Namune
 Krantisihachi Gavran Boli (compilation)
 Purushottamnama-Annasaheb P.K.Patil

Dramas
 Mrityunjay
 Chhava
 Glimpse of the Past

Mrityunjay
Mrityunjay is a novel very famous in the Marathi compositions . It is based on Karna, one of the great warrior in the epic of Mahabharata. It was awarded with many of the prizes and awards given by the Jnanpith (Moorti Devi Award).

Mrityujaya was translated in many other languages. Dr P K chandran & Dr Jayashree translated the book in to Malayalam (Karnan), which won Kendra Sahitya Akademy Award for translation in the year 2001

Yugandhar
Yugandhar is another Novel of Shivaji Sawant based on the life of Krishna, a great hindu god in Mahabharata and other narrative epics as well as the God of the Hindus.Yugandhar is one of the best and most famous Novels of Marathi language and it is awarded with many of the prizes and awards given by the Sahitya Academy. And he also wrote Contemplation on Yugandhar. Kadambini Dharap has written an English translation of the book.

Personal life
Sawant was married to Mrinalini. He has a son Amitabh and daughter Kadambini.

Death
On 18 September 2002, Sawant died at the age of 62 of cardiac arrest in Goa. He was campaigning for the post of President of 76th All India Marathi Literary Conference.

References

External links
 Rasik Library Index
 The Novel As Epic

Marathi-language writers
1940 births
2002 deaths
Indian male novelists
People from Kolhapur district
Indian schoolteachers
Indian magazine editors
20th-century Indian novelists
Novelists from Maharashtra
Educators from Maharashtra
20th-century Indian male writers
Recipients of the Moortidevi Award

He can be well known for old generation